The Coleco Adam is a home computer and expansion device for the ColecoVision released in 1983 by American toy and video game manufacturer Coleco. It was an attempt to follow on the success of the company's ColecoVision video game console.  The Adam was not very successful, partly because of early production problems, and was discontinued in early 1985.

History
Coleco announced the Adam at the Summer Consumer Electronics Show (CES) in June 1983, and executives predicted sales of 500,000 by Christmas 1983.

The Adam announcement received favorable press coverage. Competitors such as Commodore and Atari almost immediately announced similar computer/printer bundles. The company engaged in an extensive marketing campaign, with television commercials for "boys age 8 to 16 and their fathers ... the two groups that really fuel computer purchases", and print advertisements in nontechnical publications like Time and People.

The Boston Phoenix, observing that Adam's $600 price was comparable to the lowest price for a letter-quality printer alone, stated "a nice trick if they can do it!" It was a trick; the computers were shown behind tinted glass that hid the fact that they were hand-made and had non-working tape drives. In June, Coleco promised to ship the computer by August. In August it promised to ship a half million Adams by Christmas, but missed shipping dates of 1 September, 15 September, 1 October, and 15 October. Ahoy! reported that Coleco had not shipped by early October because of various problems. Each month of delay could mean losing the opportunity to sell 100,000 units, the magazine reported, adding that missing the Christmas season would result in "inestimable losses". CEO Arnold Greenberg promised in late September to ship by "mid-October", but claimed that Adam was "not, primarily, a Christmas item". The printer was the main cause of the delays; after it failed to function properly at demonstrations, by November InfoWorld reported on "growing skepticism" about its reliability, speed, and noise.

Greenberg refused to say how many units he expected Coleco to ship by the end of the year. The company did not ship review units to magazines planning to publish reviews before Christmas, stating that all were going to dealers, but admitted that it would not meet the company's goal of shipping 400,000 computers by the end of the year; Kmart and JCPenney announced in November that it would not sell the Adam during the Christmas season because of lack of availability. Despite much consumer interest for Adam and a shortage of competing home computers, Coleco shipped only 95,000 units by December, many of which were defective; Creative Computing later reported that "the rumored return rate was absolutely alarming". One store manager stated that five of six sold Adams had been returned, and expected that the sixth would likely be returned after being opened on Christmas. Coleco partnered with Honeywell Information Systems to open up repair chain stores around the nation. By December 1983, the press reported that company executives at a news conference "fielded questions about Coleco's problems with its highly-publicized new Adam home computer, which has been plagued by production delays and complaints of defects", with the company able to fulfill only one third of its Canadian orders for Christmas. Less than 10% of Adam units had defects, the company claimed, "well below industry standards".

An analyst stated in early 1984 that the company had

By March 1984, John J. Anderson declared Adam as having caused for Coleco "a trail of broken promises, unfulfilled expectations, and extremely skittish stockholders." On January 2, 1985, after continuing complaints about Adam failures and low sales, Coleco announced that it was discontinuing the Adam and would be selling off its inventory.
Coleco did not reveal which company they were selling the inventory to, but stated that they had worked with this partner before. No final sales numbers were revealed of the Adam computer and expansion, but one analyst estimated that Coleco had sold 350,000 Adams in 1983 and 1984.

Technical details
In its favor, the Adam had a large software library from the start. It was derived from and compatible with the ColecoVision's software and accessories, and, in addition, the popular CP/M operating system was available as an option. Its price gave a complete system: an 80 KB RAM computer, tape drive, letter-quality printer, and software including the Buck Rogers: Planet of Zoom video game. The IBM PCjr sold for $669 but included no peripherals, and although the popular Commodore 64 sold for around $200, its price was not much lower after the purchase of a printer, tape or disk drive, and software.

Like many home computers of its day, the Adam was intended to use a television set for its display. The SmartWriter electronic typewriter loaded when the system was turned on. In this mode, the system operated just like a typewriter, printing letters as soon as the user typed them. Pressing the Escape/WP key put SmartWriter into word processor mode, which functioned similarly to a modern word processor.

SmartBASIC
Unlike other home computers at the time, the Adam did not have its BASIC interpreter stored in ROM. Instead, it featured a built-in electronic typewriter and word processor, SmartWriter, as well as the Elementary Operating System (EOS) OS kernel and the 8 KB OS-7 ColecoVision operating system. The SmartBASIC interpreter was delivered on a proprietary-format Digital Data Pack tape cassette; this version of BASIC was designed to be mostly compatible with Applesoft BASIC. The interpreter was developed by Randall Hyde of Lazer Microsystems.

Software developers who received technical information from Coleco had to agree to an extremely restrictive license. Coleco demanded the right to inspect and demand changes in their software, forced them to destroy inventories of software if Coleco revoked the license, and prohibited them from publicly criticizing Coleco in any way.

A less expensive version of the Adam plugged into a ColecoVision, which delivered on one of ColecoVision's launch commitments that owners would one day be able to upgrade their game system to a fully featured computer system.

Printer
The Adam printer computer used daisy wheel printing, giving a higher quality print than most dot-matrix printers of the time. The print ribbon was a one-time ribbon, of the type also used by IBM Selectric typewriters. The one-time ribbon produced better quality print than reusable ribbons, but they needed to be replaced more often. While the print quality was high, the print speed was quite low. Daisy wheels with different fonts were available, but difficult to find. The printer had a friction feed rather than a tractor feed system, so they didn't need continuous form paper. The printer was only capable of printing text, so it couldn't do graphics (other than ASCII art).

Problems
Many early Adams were defective. An author of the computer's manual reported receiving "300 calls on Christmas week" from owners with problems; "some callers who were on their fourth or fifth Adam", he said. Defective computers at the time could be repaired only by mailing it to Coleco in Connecticut. Despite improving product quality and the Honeywell repair partnership, the company could not improve the computer's poor reputation. Problems included:

 The Adam generates a surge of electromagnetic energy on startup, which can erase the contents of any removable media left in or near the drive. Making this problem worse, some of the Coleco manuals instructed the user to put the tape in the drive before turning the computer on. A sticker on later Adams warned users to not turn on the power with tapes in the drive.
 Since Coleco made the unusual decision of using the printer to supply power to the entire Adam system, if the printer's power supply failed or the printer was missing, none of the system worked. Amstrad CPC and PC designs of the era did similar with the power supply in the monitor.
 Once put into Word Processor mode, SmartWriter could not get back into the typewriter mode without the system being rebooted.
 The Adam's Digital Data Pack drives, although faster and of higher capacity than the audio cassette drives used for competing computers, were less reliable and still not as fast as a floppy disk drive. At the time of Adam's design, tape drives were still a popular storage medium for home users, but by the time of its release, floppy disks had dropped in cost and in some markets were the preferred medium. Coleco eventually shipped a 160 KB 5¼ inch disk drive for the Adam.

Software

ColecoVision software that was not built-in was mostly on ROM cartridges, with AdamCalc, Personal Checkbook, and SmartFiler programs also being on tape.

Adam Banner
AdamCalc
Business Pack I
CP/M 2.2 and Assembler
Data Calculator
Home Budget Planning
Personal Accountant
Personal Checkbook
Power Print
Savings and Loan
SmartFiler
SmartLetters & Forms
SmartLOGO
Turbo Load
Update for Coleco AdamLink Modem

Reception
To showcase the machine at the June 1983 CES, Coleco decided to demonstrate a port of its ColecoVision conversion of Donkey Kong on the system. Nintendo was in the midst of negotiating a deal with Atari to license its Famicom (later called the Nintendo Entertainment System) for distribution outside Japan, and the final signing would have been done at CES.  Atari had exclusive rights to Donkey Kong for home computers (as Coleco had for game consoles), and when Atari saw that Coleco was showing Donkey Kong on a computer, its proposed deal with Nintendo was delayed.  Coleco had to agree not to sell the Adam version of Donkey Kong.  Ultimately, it had no bearing on the Atari/Nintendo deal, as Atari's CEO Ray Kassar was fired the next month and the proposal went nowhere, with Nintendo deciding to market its system on its own.

Byte reported in September 1983 that the Adam's introduction had "dominated" the Consumer Electronics Show in Chicago. Citing its $599 price, bundled hardware, and compatibility with ColecoVision and CP/M software, the magazine compared the Adam's potential impact on the home-computer industry to that of the Osborne 1. Ahoy! reported in January 1984 that "Early indications were that the Adam would be a runaway best seller" but the delays, technical problems, and Coleco's reputation as a toy company "should combine to keep buyers away in droves", and predicted that "there is no reason to think that the Adam will topple the C-64 from the catbird seat".

The Washington Posts T. R. Reid gave "an 'A' for ingenuity [but] would have to stretch to give Adam a gentleman's 'C' for performance" in January 1984. While praising the keyboard and SmartWriter's ease of use, and calling the data pack "a reasonable compromise", he described the documentation as "wholly inadequate" and "generally inexcusable". "A more serious flaw with Adam is in the hardware", Reid said, citing defects in a data pack and both the printer and a replacement, and the computer's unusability without a working printer. He concluded that "I'd dearly like to" recommend the Adam, but "for the time being, though, I'd advise you to proceed with caution", including confirming that the computer worked before leaving the store. Popular Mechanics in February 1984 was more favorable. Calling the bundle "the most revolutionary concept in how to design and sell a home computer that we have seen", it also praised the keyboard and SmartWriter. While citing flaws such as the "slow and very noisy printer", the magazine concluded that "Adam competes with and overpowers everything else in its class", inferior only to the IBM PC and Apple IIe.

Compute!s March 1984 review also approved of the Adam's prepackaged, all-in-one nature and called the keyboard "impressive", but cited widespread reports of hardware failures. Bytes April 1984 review was much harsher, stating that "It is often said that if something sounds too good to be true, it probably is. The Coleco Adam is no exception to this rule". It called the tape-drive technology "impressive", and approved of the keyboard, but reported several cases of data errors and deletions when using the tape drives, a buggy word processor, and a BASIC manual that was "the worst I have ever seen". The reviewer reported that he was waiting for his fifth Adam after four previous systems malfunctioned in two months; only the keyboard did not fail. Surmising that "the computer was apparently rushed into production", he advised "don't buy an Adam—yet. Wait until Coleco fixes all of the Adam's bugs and delivers on all of its promises", and concluded "Coleco is [apparently] betting the whole company on the Adam and it's not yet clear that it's going to win that bet".

The Adam received some good reviews based on the quality of its keyboard and printer, and offered competitive sound and graphics. Its BASIC interpreter, called SmartBASIC, was largely compatible with Applesoft BASIC, which meant that many type-in programs from computer books and magazines would work with the Adam with little or no modification.

Sales were weak, especially after the technical problems became obvious. Coleco lost $35 million in the fourth quarter of 1984 as returns flooded in. Officially, Coleco blamed "manuals which did not offer the first-time user adequate assistance." Coleco reintroduced Adam with a new instruction manual, lower price, and a $500 college scholarship along with each unit for use by a young child (with $125 paid for each completed year of college). Fewer than 100,000 units ultimately sold.

New York City advertising firm, Ketchum Advertising, won the assignment of promoting the computer. The agency staffed up to handle the work, and the prestige, of the new business, but agency executives were caught off-guard, when they opened the New York Times January 1985 morning edition, to read, with no previous warning, that Coleco was abandoning the computer.

The Adam was permanently discontinued in 1985, less than two years after its introduction.

Legacy
A group of Adam enthusiasts have been gathering every year since 1989 for an event called AdamCon.

Third-party developers contributed to the overall success of the Adam after Coleco abandoned the Adam.  Developers such as Orphanware, In House Reps, Thomas Electronics, Oasis Pensive, Eve, E&T, Micro Innovations, Microfox Technologies and others added multiple-density disk drives, memory expanders, speech synthesizers, serial cards, printer cards, IDE cards and other hardware so the Adam could follow other computers into a newer modern age.

Specifications

 CPU: Zilog Z80 @ 3.58 MHz
 Support processors: three Motorola 6801 processors at 1 MHz (memory & I/O, tape, and keyboard control)
 Memory: 64 KB RAM, 16 KB video RAM; 32 KB ROM
 Expansion: 3 internal slots, 1 cartridge slot, and a 62.5 kbit/s half-duplex serial bus called AdamNet. Both the stand-alone and expansion-module versions also have an external expansion port of the same type as the ColecoVision expansion port, on the right hand side.
 Secondary storage: Digital Data Pack tape cassette, 256 KB
 Graphics: Texas Instruments TMS9928A (a close relative of the TMS9918 in the TI-99/4A)
 256 × 192 resolution
 32 sprites
 Sound: Texas Instruments SN76489AN (a rebranded version of the TMS9919 in the TI-99/4A)
 3 voices
 white noise

References

External links

 The Dot Eaters history of Coleco and the ADAM
 Adamcon
 Oldcomputers.net's Adam page with photos of components
 1984 ADAM TV commercial (WarGames parody)

Adam
Computer-related introductions in 1983
Home computers
Orphaned technology
Video game console add-ons
Z80-based home computers